Cardinals are senior ecclesiastical leaders of the Catholic Church, almost always ordained bishops and generally holding important roles within the church, such as governing prominent archdioceses or managing dicasteries within the Roman Curia. They are created in consistories by the pope and one of their foremost duties is the election of a new pope (invariably from among themselves, although not a formal requirement) when the Holy See is vacant, following the death or the resignation of the reigning pontiff. The body of all cardinals is collectively known as the College of Cardinals.

This list includes all ethnic Poles, living and deceased, who were raised to the rank of cardinal, including those who were born or carried out their pastoral services outside Poland, such as Cardinal Kazimierz Świątek who was born in Estonia and worked as a bishop in Belarus. People of other ethnic origins who were naturalized in Poland, such as the 17th-century Hungarian-born Cardinal Báthory Endre, are not included.

Three of the Polish cardinals, namely Fryderyk Jagiellończyk, Jan Olbracht Waza and Jan Kazimierz Waza, were of royal blood. The latter was elected king of Poland after he had renounced his cardinalate. Karol Wojtyła was the only Polish cardinal to be elected pope. As Pope John Paul II, he elevated ten of his compatriots to cardinalate, the largest number of Polish cardinals created by a single pope.

Roughly one out of two Polish cardinals was a bishop of one of Poland's historically two most important episcopal sees: Gniezno, the capital city of Poland until 1034, and Kraków, Poland's capital from 1038 to 1596. All bishops of Kraków since 1890, as well as all primates of Poland (an honorific title traditionally bestowed on the archbishop of Gniezno), since 1919 have been created cardinals.

Cardinals are sorted in chronological order by date of elevation to cardinalate, indicated in the Elevated column. Cardinals elevated during the same century are marked by the same color on the bar on the left-hand side of the table. The date of elevation is the date of the consistory during which a given person was officially proclaimed cardinal by the pope. In some cases, especially in former times, a cardinal may have received the red hat after the consistory or never. Those, whose elevation was intended by a pope, but died before the consistory, as well as pseudocardinals elevated by antipopes, are listed in italics.

Two of the cardinals listed here, Jan Olbracht Waza and Marian Jaworski, were elevated in pectore, which means that their names were kept secret by the pope and revealed only on later consistories. In these cases, the date of elevation is the date of the in pectore elevation, not the date of the subsequent publication.

Cardinals are technically deacons or priests of Roman churches known as tituli. Their ranks (cardinal deacon or cardinal priest; there have been no cardinal bishops of Polish origin) and titular churches are indicated in the Cardinal title column. The "Other titles" column shows other, especially episcopal, titles held by the given person during his cardinalate.

The Conclaves column lists all conclaves, that is papal elections, that took place during a person's cardinalate and indicates whether he participated in a given conclave or not. Since Ingravescentem aetatem in 1970, cardinals who are 80 years or older at the beginning of a conclave are ineligible to participate.

The Ref. column provides links to external online references.

Polish cardinals eligible for participation in a conclave 
, three of the living Polish cardinals listed above are less than 80 years old and hence eligible to participate in a conclave. They are listed below by date of birth.

References

Sources 

Polish
 
Cardinals
Cardinals